Maria Machado may refer to:
María Corina Machado (born 1967), Venezuelan human rights activist and politician
Ana Maria Machado (born 1941), writer from Portugal
Joaquim Maria Machado de Assis (1839–1908), Brazilian novelist and poet
Maria Clara Machado (1921–2001), Brazilian playwright